The Royal Institute of Chemistry was a British scientific organisation. Founded in 1877 as the Institute of Chemistry of Great Britain and Ireland (ICGBI), its role was to focus on qualifications and the professional status of chemists, and its aim was to ensure that consulting and analytical chemists were properly trained and qualified.  

The society received its first Royal Charter on 13 June 1885, and King George VI awarded the society royal patronage with effect from 14 May 1943, from which date it became the Royal Institute of Chemistry of Great Britain and Ireland (RICGBI). This re-designation was formally confirmed by the grant of a Supplemental Charter on 29 March 1944.

As well as insisting on thorough professional qualifications, it also laid down strict ethical standards. Its main qualifications were Licentiate (LRIC) (professional training following a course of practical study to a standard lower than an honours degree), Graduate (GRIC) (completion of study equivalent to at least second class honours degree), Associate (ARIC) (LRIC plus professional experience), Member (MRIC) (GRIC plus professional experience) and Fellow (FRIC) (more experience and standing than MRIC) of the Royal Institute of Chemistry. Following a supplemental Charter in 1975, Members and Fellows were permitted to use the letters CChem (Chartered Chemist). It published Royal Institute of Chemistry Reviews from 1968 to 1971, when it combined to form Chemical Society Reviews, and the Journal of the Royal Institute of Chemistry.

At the same time, the Chemical Society had concentrated on the science of chemistry, and publishing learned journals.  In 1972 these two organisations, together with the Faraday Society and the Society for Analytical Chemistry, started the process of merger, becoming the Royal Society of Chemistry on 15 May 1980.

Presidents 

 Sir Edward Frankland: 1877–1880
 Sir Frederick Augustus Abel: 1880–1883
 William Odling: 1883–1888
 James Bell: 1888–1891
 William Augustus Tilden: 1891–1894
 William James Russell: 1894–1897
 Sir Thomas Stevenson: 1897–1900
 John Millar Thomson: 1900–1903
 David Howard: 1903–1906
 Percy Faraday Frankland: 1906–1909
 Sir George Thomas Beilby: 1909–1912
 Raphael Meldola: 1912–1915
 James Johnston Dobbie: 1915–1918
 Sir Herbert Jackson: 1918–1921
 Alfred Chapman: 1921–1924
 Professor George Gerald Henderson: 1924–1927
 Arthur Smithells: 1927–1930
 Sir George Christopher Clayton: 1930–1933
 Sir Jocelyn Field Thorpe: 1933–1936
 Sir Robert Howson Pickard: 1936–1939
 William Alexander Skeen Calder: 1939–1940
 Sir John Jacob Fox: 1940–1943
 Alexander Findlay: 1943–1946
 Gerald Roche Lynch: 1946–1949
 Sir James Wilfred Cook: 1949–1951
 Herbert William Cremer: 1951–1953
 Sir Harry Jephcott: 1953–1955
 Douglas William Kent-Jones: 1955–1957
 William Wardlaw: 1957–1958
 Ernest Le Quesne Herbert: 1959–1961
 Sir William Kershaw Slater: 1961–1963
 Harry Julius Emeleus: 1963–1965
 Sir Frank Hartley: 1965–1967
 Leslie Henry Williams: 1967–1970
 Sir Ewart Ray Herbert Jones: 1970–1972
 Frank Arnold Robinson: 1972–1974
 Charles Kemball: 1974–1976
 Charles Norman Thompson: 1976–1978
 Professor Richard Oswald Chandler Norman: 1978–1980

References

Chemists by profession. The origins of the Royal Institute of Chemistry, C. A. Russell, with N. G. Coley and G. K. Roberts, Milton Keynes, The Open University Press, in association with the Royal Institute of Chemistry, 1977 see review.
History of Royal Society of Chemistry and the former societies

 
Royal Society of Chemistry
Defunct professional associations based in the United Kingdom
Defunct learned societies of the United Kingdom
1877 establishments in the United Kingdom
Scientific organizations established in 1877